Piz Alv (2,854.5 m) is a mountain of the Oberhalbstein Alps, located east of Innerferrera in the canton of Graubünden. It lies on the chain between the Val Ferrera and the Val Nandro.

References

External links
 Piz Alv on Hikr

Mountains of the Alps
Mountains of Switzerland
Mountains of Graubünden
Two-thousanders of Switzerland
Ferrera